House of Fortune (Chinese: 钱来运转) is a Singaporean drama produced and telecast on Mediacorp Channel 8. The show aired at 9pm on weekdays and had a repeat telecast at 8am the following day. It is a Lunar New Year drama for 2016. It consists of 20 episodes, will begin its run from 19 January 2016. The series is partly sponsored by the Media Development Authority of Singapore. It stars Zhu Houren , Thomas Ong , Tong Bing Yu , Yao Wenlong , Ya Hui, Bonnie Loo, Shane Pow, Kym Ng & Xiang Yun as the casts of this series.

Cast

Qian Laoshi's Family

Qian Renjie's Family

Wu Guolun's Family

Chen Xiulian's Family

Other Characters

Cameo appearance

Awards & Nominations

Star Awards 2017
House of Fortune is nominated for 2 awards, London Choco Roll Happiness Award &  Best Supporting Actress.

Trivia
Aden Tan's debut drama series.
Daren Tan's comeback Mandarin drama after The Defining Moment (2008) and first villainous role.
Bonnie Loo's very first villainous role.
The series was repeated at 8am.
This series is preempted on 8 and 9 February 2016, due to Chinese New Year specials.
The Series repeat its telecasts on Channel 8 at 5.30pm succeeding Tiger Mum

Inconsistencies
There were technical errors in the Chinese subtitling on Channel 8 where it stopped showing for a brief period, beginning from this drama whenever the derogatory term for being a wretch, "死八婆", as well as similar terms, is uttered. This is already evident in episode 12, where Yao Wenlong calls Kym Ng the derogatory term twice, before correcting himself to mean that she is a "黄脸婆" (an old hag). The old hag term is also used on her in a later episode.

See also
 List of programmes broadcast by Mediacorp Channel 8

References

Singapore Chinese dramas
2016 Singaporean television series debuts
2016 Singaporean television series endings
Channel 8 (Singapore) original programming